James William Duncan (July 1, 1871 – October 16, 1901) was a Major League Baseball player.

Biography
He was born on July 1, 1871 in Saltsburg, Pennsylvania.

Duncan played baseball in the minor leagues from 1895 to 1899. He was picked up by the National League's Washington Senators in July 1899; but after batting just .234 in 14 games, he was released. He then played the rest of the season for the worst major league team in history, the 1899 Cleveland Spiders. He had a .229 average in 105 at-bats. Duncan never played again after the 1899 season ended.

Two years later at the age of 30, Duncan drowned during a fishing trip on October 16, 1901 in Foxburg, Pennsylvania.  According to a newspaper report, "In company with two friends, he went out in a row boat to fish, taking a quantity of dynamite to kill the fish. It is supposed that the boat was overturned by the explosion of the dynamite. Nothing was heard of the party for a few days when the bodies were found." He was buried in Grove Hill Cemetery in Oil City, Pennsylvania.

References

External links

1871 births
1901 deaths
Major League Baseball catchers
Cleveland Spiders players
Washington Senators (1891–1899) players
Baseball players from Pennsylvania
Jamestown (minor league baseball) players
Franklin Braves players
Twin Cities Twins players
Portland (minor league baseball) players
Springfield Ponies players
Springfield Maroons players
New Britain Rangers players
Rome Romans players
Toronto Canucks players
Paterson Giants players
Toronto Maple Leafs (International League) players
Deaths by drowning in the United States
19th-century baseball players
People from Saltsburg, Pennsylvania
Accidental deaths in Pennsylvania